Clarence Eugene Love (born June 16, 1976) is a former American football safety who played in the National Football League. Love starred at local Jackson High School and was a member of the Jackson Citizen Patriot's Dream Team. Love attended college at the University of Toledo and was drafted by the Philadelphia Eagles in the 4th round of the 1998 NFL Draft. He played with the Eagles (1998), the Baltimore Ravens (1999–2000), and the Oakland Raiders (2002–2004). Love won Super Bowl XXXV with the Baltimore Ravens. Love graduated in 1993 at Jackson High School.

References

External links
Pro-Football Reference

1976 births
Living people
Sportspeople from Jackson, Michigan
Players of American football from Michigan
American football defensive backs
Toledo Rockets football players
Philadelphia Eagles players
Frankfurt Galaxy players
Jacksonville Jaguars players
Baltimore Ravens players
Oakland Raiders players